Clovis Unified School District is a public school system located in Clovis, California, with its headquarters located at 1450, Herndon Avenue, Clovis. The district includes almost all of the City of Clovis along with a portion of the City of Fresno, extending to the community of Friant and some of unincorporated eastern Fresno County. There is talk of making a Clovis South High school, but this has not been officially confirmed.

It is one of the few non-union school districts in California, unlike the nearby Sanger and Fresno school districts.

The elementary schools that make up this district include: Century Elementary, Cole Elementary, Dry Creek Elementary, Garfield Elementary, Tarpey Elementary, Woods Elementary and many more.

The middle schools that make up this district include: Clark Intermediate, Kastner Intermediate, Granite Ridge Intermediate, Reyburn Intermediate and Alta Sierra Intermediate.

The high schools that make up this district include: Clovis High, Clovis West, Clovis North, Clovis East , Buchanan , and Gateway high school (gHS) which is a high school in the CUHS branch

The current superintendent is Eimear O’Brian.

References

External links 

School districts in Fresno County, California
Clovis, California